Gerardo Seeliger (born 6 September 1947) is a Spanish sailor. He competed in the Finn event at the 1972 Summer Olympics.

References

External links
 

1947 births
Living people
Spanish male sailors (sport)
Olympic sailors of Spain
Sailors at the 1972 Summer Olympics – Finn
Sportspeople from Madrid